Flecchia is a frazione (and a parish)  of the municipality of Pray, in Piedmont, northern Italy.

Name 
In former times the village was named Flechia or Felicetum Libicorum.

History

In 1305, Flecchia was severely damaged by the followers of fra Dolcino, who set fire to it.

The local parish of Sant'Ambrogio was established in 1438.

Since 1928 it has been a separate comune (municipality).

Notable buildings
Palazzo Riccio (or Palazzo Rizzi): the palace, which overlooks the village, was built in the 17th century on the remains of a middle ages fortress.
Saint Ambrogio parish church, which was built in its present form during the 17th century.

References

External links

Frazioni of the Province of Biella
Former municipalities of the Province of Biella